The World Amateur Golf Ranking for men was introduced by The R&A, the governing body of the sport of golf outside the United States and Mexico, on 23 January 2007. It is based on the results of over 2,600 amateur tournaments per year (and amateurs participating in certain professional events) and is updated each Wednesday. Rankings are based on the players' average performances in counting events over a rolling period. This period was 52 weeks initially but was gradually expanded during 2016 to 104 weeks, similar to those of the Official World Golf Ranking.

Like the Official World Golf Ranking for male professional golfers, the amateur ranking was initiated by The R&A to provide a more reliable means of selecting an appropriate field for one of its tournaments. The professional ranking was initially used to help set the field for The Open Championship and the amateur ranking plays a role in selecting the field for The Amateur Championship, which was previously selected mainly on the basis of national handicap systems. Other tournament organisers will be able to use the rankings to select players if they so wish.

The first set of rankings featured over 1,000 players from 46 countries and was headed by the 2006 U.S. Amateur champion, Richie Ramsay of Scotland.

In February 2011, the United States Golf Association (USGA) endorsed the rankings and announced it would use them for an exemption category in all their men's amateur championships, including the U.S. Amateur, beginning in 2011.

The women's rankings were started in February 2011. Mitsuki Katahira was the first number one. Leona Maguire holds the record for most weeks at the top of the rankings with 135 weeks.

Only three male and two female golfers have ever held the No. 1-ranking as both an amateur and a professional. The first to do so was Rory McIlroy, who was  when he became the No. 1 amateur and  when he first became the world No. 1 professional. Jordan Spieth was the second to accomplish this feat, he was  when he topped the amateur rankings and  when he reached No. 1 in the Official World Golf Ranking. Jon Rahm, who was ranked no. 1 for 60 weeks, became professional world no. 1 in July 2020. Lydia Ko was the first player to accomplish this feat in the female ranking. She was only  and held the ranking for a record 130 consecutive weeks, and she was a mere  when she first reached the pinnacle of the Women's World Golf Rankings (WWGR). Atthaya Thitikul held the amateur No. 1 for 12 weeks in 2019–2020 and topped the WWGR on 31 October 2022.

Chronology of Men's World Number Ones

Key

Chronology of Women's World Number Ones

Key

Elite events
Prior to 2020, events were ranked in eight categories: Elite, A, B, C, D, E, F or G. The Elite events are listed below. The calculation of the ranking changed in 2020 and there are no longer any categories.

Men
The Amateur Championship
European Amateur
U.S. Amateur
Asia-Pacific Amateur Championship
Eisenhower Trophy
NCAA Division I Men's Golf Championships (beginning in 2016)

Women
The Womens Amateur Championship
European Ladies Amateur Championship
U.S. Women's Amateur
Women's Amateur Asia-Pacific
Espirito Santo Trophy
NCAA Division I Women's Golf Championships

References

External links

Amateur golf
Golf rankings